Richard D. Martin (July 14, 1932 – March 8, 2008) was an American football coach and college athletics administrator. He served as the head football coach at Rose Polytechnic Institute—now known as Rose-Hulman Institute of Technology—in Terre Haute, Indiana from 1964 to 1967 and Washington University in St. Louis from 1968 to 1971, compiling a career college football coaching record of 24–43–3. Martin was the athletic director at West Virginia University from 1978 to 1981 and the commissioner of the Missouri Valley Conference (MVC) from 1981 to 1985.

Head coaching record

College

References

1932 births
2008 deaths
Missouri Valley Conference commissioners
Ottawa Braves football players
Rose–Hulman Fightin' Engineers football coaches
Washington University Bears football coaches
West Virginia Mountaineers athletic directors
High school football coaches in Kansas
People from La Crosse, Wisconsin
Players of American football from Wisconsin